The Fort Payne Boom Town Historic District is a historic district in Fort Payne, Alabama.  The district encompasses five properties built around 1889, when Fort Payne was undergoing huge growth owing to the area's mineral deposits.  Included are the Alabama Great Southern Depot; the Fort Payne Opera House; the Sawyer Building, a two-story Victorian commercial building; City Park, which sat across from the (now-demolished) county courthouse; and Purdy Furniture, which built as the headquarters of the Fort Payne Coal and Iron Company.  Another Victorian commercial building has since been demolished.  The district was listed on the National Register of Historic Places in 1989.

References

National Register of Historic Places in DeKalb County, Alabama
Buildings and structures completed in 1889
Historic districts in DeKalb County, Alabama
Historic districts on the National Register of Historic Places in Alabama